János Dudás (13 February 1911 - 1979) was a Hungarian football midfielder who played for Hungary in the 1934 and 1938 FIFA World Cups. He also played for MTK Budapest F.C.

References

External links
 FIFA profile

1911 births
1979 deaths
Hungarian footballers
Hungary international footballers
Association football midfielders
MTK Budapest FC players
1934 FIFA World Cup players
1938 FIFA World Cup players